Shadwell v Shadwell [1860] EWHC CP J88 is an English contract law case, which held that it would be a valid consideration for the court to enforce a contract if a pre-existing duty was performed, so long as it was for a third party.

Facts
Mr Shadwell was engaged to marry Ellen Nicholl (this is a binding contract). His Uncle Charles promised £150 a year in a letter after the marriage. He wrote,

Sadly, Uncle Charles died. Mr Shadwell alleged that his Uncle had not paid in full before the death and claimed the outstanding money from his Uncle's estate. The estate refused to pay on the ground that Mr Shadwell had given no consideration for the promise to pay the £150 pa.

Judgment
The Court of Common Pleas held that there was good consideration for the promise by the nephew marrying Ellen Nicholl, despite the fact that the marriage had already happened when the promise was made. There was good consideration in performing a pre-existing contract, if it was with a third party.

Erle CJ said,

Byles J dissented. In particular he disagreed on the factual question that the marriage was at the Uncle's request.

Keating J agreed with Erle CJ.

See also
Chappell & Co Ltd v Nestle Co Ltd [1960] AC 87
Hamer v Sidway 124 NY 538 (1891)
White v Bluett (1853) 23 LJ Ex 36
Hawes v Armstrong 1 N. C. 761, 1 Scott, 661, Tindall CJ
Eastwood v Kenyon 11 Ad. & E. 438, 3 P. & D. 276

Notes
“The marriage affects the parties there to, but in the second degree it may be an object of interest with a near relative, and in that sense a benefit to him, this benefit is also derived from the plaintiff at the uncle’s request if the promise of the annuity was intended as an inducement to marriage and the averment that the plaintiff relying on the promise, marriage is an agreement that the promise was an inducement to the marriage. This is a consideration averred in the declaration. and it appears to me to be expressed in the letter construed with the surrounding circumstances.”

References
https://www.lawarticle.in/shedwell-vs-shedwell/

External

https://www.lawarticle.in/shedwell-vs-shedwell/ links

English contract case law
1860 in case law
1860 in British law
Court of Common Pleas (England) cases